Japanese musician Ayumi Hamasaki has released more than 100 music videos since her debut in 1998, creating works for songs she has released as singles, as well as songs found exclusively on albums. Hamasaki has released 37 video albums, including 27 concert footage releases. Many of these have been successful, debuting at number one in Japan or Taiwan, while several have been certified gold by the RIAJ: Complete Live Box A (2003), A Museum: 30th Single Collection Live (2004), Arena Tour 2005 A: My Story (2005) and Arena Tour 2006 A: (Miss)understood (2006). Most of these concerts feature footage from her arena tours in Japan, or from her annual Countdown Live New Year's events. Her Tour of Secret video album featured footage from her concerts in Japan, Taiwan, Hong Kong and Shanghai in 2007, while her Ayumi Hamasaki Asia Tour 2008: 10th Anniversary concert recording was filmed exclusively in Taipei, Taiwan.

Music videos

As a featured artist

Video albums

Music video albums

Live concert video albums

Other video albums

Notes

References

Videography
Videographies of Japanese artists